Zhang Qing (born 7 April 1980) is a Chinese skier. He competed at the 2002 Winter Olympics and the 2006 Winter Olympics.

References

External links
 

1980 births
Living people
Chinese male biathletes
Chinese male cross-country skiers
Olympic biathletes of China
Olympic cross-country skiers of China
Biathletes at the 2002 Winter Olympics
Cross-country skiers at the 2006 Winter Olympics
Skiers from Liaoning
Sport shooters from Liaoning
People from Tieling
Asian Games medalists in biathlon
Biathletes at the 1999 Asian Winter Games
Biathletes at the 2003 Asian Winter Games
Biathletes at the 2007 Asian Winter Games
Asian Games gold medalists for China
Asian Games silver medalists for China
Asian Games bronze medalists for China
Medalists at the 1999 Asian Winter Games
Medalists at the 2003 Asian Winter Games
Medalists at the 2007 Asian Winter Games